The Anchor Hotel is a 1997 gay pornographic film, directed by Kristen Bjorn. It runs for 115 minutes and features 23 men. This video centers on military sailors who encounter each other in Miami and then have sex in hotel rooms. It is highly praised and honored with awards.

Scenes 
 Mark Anthony, Pedro Pandilla, and Rafael Perez in threesome
 Dean Spencer, Andras Garotni, and Ivan Cseska in threesome
 The man in the solo scene; Sasha Borov, Sandor Vesanyi, Ferenc Botos, and Gabor Szabo in foursome
 Antonio DiMarco and other nine men, including five masked men, in voodoo orgy
 Igor Natenko and Karl Letovski

Reception 
Adam Gay Video Directory rated The Anchor Hotel all of five stars and called it a collaboration of "all the Bjorn Trademarks". Keeneye Reeves from TLA Video and Gay Chicago Magazine rated this video all of four stars. Brad Benedict from Ambush MAG praised it as "two hours of beautiful guys". The reviewer from Frisky Fans website rated it four out of five stars, verified that men wore condoms during sex scenes, and praised it with "minimalist plot". Nevertheless, he found the orgy scene the "weakest", even with "hot guys" involved. Two reviewers from Rad Video highly praised this video. One of them, Tim Evanson, called it Bjorn's redemption from his past few films that Evanson condemned, yet he negated the foursome scene as weak and noticed some men's lack of erection during the orgy scene.

In the 1997 Grabby Awards, it was awarded the "Best International Video", and Kristen Bjorn won the "Best Director" for this video and two other videos.

References

External links 
 
 The Anchor Hotel review at ReelGuys.org

1997 films
Gay pornographic films
1990s pornographic films
Films set in Miami